Jonathan Lemire (born November 28, 1979) is an American journalist and political correspondent. He is currently the White House bureau chief of Politico and is the host of MSNBC's morning news show Way Too Early.

Early life and education 
Lemire grew up in Lowell, Massachusetts. He graduated from Central Catholic High School in Lawrence, Massachusetts, where he was a record-setting runner for the school's track and field team, and earned a bachelor's degree in history from Columbia University in 2001.

Career 
At Columbia, he wrote for the student newspaper, Columbia Daily Spectator, and later interned at the New York Daily News in 2001, "I was told that I would never be hired but I could stay on as an intern for another few months." A week later, the September 11 attacks occurred, he remained an intern, and "was eventually brought on staff". Lemire worked there for more than a decade.

In 2013, Lemire joined the Associated Press, where he covered New York City politics as well as Donald Trump and Joe Biden’s administrations. He gained media attention for his news conference question, to Trump about Russia's Vladimir Putin at their July 2018 Helsinki summit, "Who do you believe, Putin or U.S. intelligence?" Lemire has also been a longtime political analyst for MSNBC and NBC News.

In October 2021, MSNBC named Lemire as the new host of its early morning news show Way Too Early, taking over full-time reporting duties from Kasie Hunt. He was also named White House bureau chief of Politico and began his duties in November 2021.

Works

Personal life 
In 2008, Lemire married fellow journalist Carrie Melago, who is a managing editor of Chalkbeat. They met while they were both working at The Daily News. The couple has two children.

References 

1979 births
Politico people
MSNBC people
People from Lowell, Massachusetts
Columbia College (New York) alumni
Associated Press reporters
New York Daily News people
Journalists from Massachusetts
Television anchors from Boston
NBC News people
Living people
21st-century American journalists